WSJP-LD (channel 30) is a dual Cozi TV/Fox-affiliated television station licensed to Aguadilla, Puerto Rico. The station is owned by California-based Caribbean Broadcasting Network. Before the launch of The CW, WSJP was a dual affiliate of UPN and The WB.

Prior to the station's flash cut to digital, The CW and LATV were WSJP's sole affiliations. Since the switch, sister stations WPRU-LP has gone silent, along with its call-sign deleted from the Federal Communications Commission website.

Digital television

Digital channels
The station's digital signal is multiplexed:

At some point on March 20, 2015, WSJP-LD removed its simulcast of WORA-DT2/ABC 5 from 18.1 and moved its third subchannel to 18.1 from 18.3 to replace it. On September 1, 2016, it was announced that WSJP-LD would lose its CW affiliation, and broadcasts Cozi TV full-time on channel 18.1. On September 24, 2019, WSJP-LD swapped their channel positions from channel 18.1 to channel 30.1.

References

External links 
COZI TV Puerto Rico
FoxTVPuertoRico.com
Caribbean Broadcasting Network

Aguadilla, Puerto Rico
Cozi TV affiliates
Fox network affiliates
Comet (TV network) affiliates
This TV affiliates
Low-power television stations in the United States
SJP-LD
Television channels and stations established in 2005
2005 establishments in Puerto Rico